Hatshepsut was an ancient Egyptian king's daughter of the 13th Dynasty, around 1750 BC. There are three instances where a person named Hatshepsut is mentioned. It is not known if these are the same or different individuals.

Hatshepsut, daughter of Queen Nofret 
She is known from a limestone stela now in the Cairo Egyptian Museum (CG 20394) and found at Abydos, where it is stated that she was the daughter of a king's wife Nofret. The name of her royal father is not recorded here. The queen Nofret is not known from other sources. Hatshepsut appears on this stela as wife of the military man Nedjesankh/Iu who had a second wife with the name Nubemwakh. On the stela is also mentioned her daughter, the lady of the houses Nebetiunet.

A 13th–Dynasty scarab
A king's daughter Hatshepsut is also known from a scarab seal. According to Kim Ryholt the scarab can be dated to the time before Sobekhotep III on stylistic grounds.

Hatshepsut, a King's Daughter from the time of Ameny Qemau
In 2017, a 13th Dynasty pyramid at Dahshur was discovered. In the pyramid was found a stone slab with pyramid texts and the name of the king Ameny Qemau. In the same pyramid was found a canopic box naming the king's daughter Hatshepsut, and the fragmented remains of a wooden coffin (later partially reconstructed) carved in a style consistent with a high status female of the Middle Kingdom.

References

18th-century BC women
Princesses of the Thirteenth Dynasty of Egypt